Dr Henry Howe Arnold Bemrose FGS (13 March 1857, Derby – 17 July 1939, Derby) was an English printer, publisher, and geologist.

He, early in life, assumed the name of "Arnold-Bemrose" to distinguish his name from that of his father, Sir Henry Howe Bemrose (1827–1911) and, upon the death of his father, reverted to the name "Bemrose". Arnold-Bemrose graduated B.A. 1879 from Clare College, Cambridge and then entered his father's printing firm of Bemrose and Sons, where he remained active for over fifty years. Arnold-Bemrose received his M.A. in 1882 and his Sc.D. in 1908 from Clare College, Cambridge. He was the Mayor of Derby for 1909.

He published over twenty papers dealing mostly with geology, as well as the 1910 book Derbyshire on the county's geology, history, antiquities, and architecture. He received the Murchison Medal in 1938.

References

External links 
 

1857 births
1939 deaths
People from Derby
Alumni of Clare College, Cambridge
English geologists
Mayors of Derby
Fellows of the Geological Society of London